The cuisine of Mauritius is greatly influenced by the tropical location of the island as well as the cultural diversity which characterizes the country. Mauritian cuisine is a blend of African, Chinese, European (mainly French) and Indian influences in the history of Mauritius. Most of the dishes and culinary traditions are inspired by French culture, former African slaves, Indian workers and Chinese migrants arriving during the 19th century. Over the years, communities found in Mauritius have adapted and mixed each other's cuisine to their liking, resulting in the development of Mauritian cuisine. While some popular dishes and desserts are consumed by Mauritians of all ethnic groups or communities, there are also form of cuisines which remain distinctly ethnic and are unique to a specific ethnic community due to their ancestral cultural and historical connections. Local food which varies depending on ethnic communities therefore reflects the strong traditional, cultural, and historical influences of each community. 

Dishes from French cuisine have grown very popular in Mauritius. Sino-Mauritian cuisine is one of the most prevalent in the restaurants throughout the island.

Common ingredients 

The most common vegetables used in Mauritian cuisine are tomatoes, onions, lady's finger (called "lalo"), eggplants (called  "brinzel"), chayote (called "chou chou"), garlic and chillies. Rice and seafoods including salted fish, smoked blue marlin, shrimp, octopus, prawns, and crayfish (called "camaron") are also staple ingredients used in Mauritian cuisine. 

Spices such as chilli peppers, cardamon, and cloves are widespread in Mauritian cuisine.

Common foods

Staple food 
Rice is a staple food of Mauritius; it is available in different forms such as fried, boiled, or cooked. It is eaten along with other dishes made of vegetables, meat, and seafood.

Main and side dishes 
Chinese noodles (fried or boiled), fried rice ("diri frir"), "bol renversé", "boulettes" (i.e. fish balls, vegetables and meat balls in broth), Sino-Mauritian spring rolls, chop suey, "halim" ("haleem"), "bryani" (also "briani" or "brié"), "dholl puri", roti served with tomato sauce and pickles, curry, and "sept caris" (thali) are popular form of dishes for the Mauritians regardless of their ethnicity. Another popular dish is "vinnday" (or "vindaye");  the spicier version of vinnday is made by using a mixture of vinegar, mustard seeds, and turmeric.

Mauritius is known for its sauces and curries which are typically served with meat, seafood, and vegetables dishes. Other common preparations are chutney, archard, and pickles. The Mauritian curries are unique as they rarely contains coconut milk, typically uses European herbs (e.g. thyme), and uses more variety of meat (e.g. duck) and seafood (e.g. octopus). The rougaille (also written as "rougay") is a tomato sauce cooked with onions, garlic, chillies, ginger and variety of spices, which is popular;  it can be eaten with fish, meat and vegetables.  The Mauritian versions of curry, chutney, rougaille, and pickles have a local flavour and differ, at times considerably, from the original Indian recipes.

Snacks

Desserts and pastries

Common drinks

Alcoholic drinks

Non-alcoholic drinks

History

Dutch influences 
During the Dutch Period (1598-1710 AD), sugarcane (from Java) was first introduced to the island. At the time, Sugarcane was mainly cultivated for the production of arrack, a precursor to rum. It wasn't until 60 years later that sugar as we know it was produced.

In 1639, deer from Java island were brought to Mauritius by the Dutch governor, Adrian Van Der Stel, for livestock purposes. Following a cyclone, the deer broke free and returned to the wild.

Dishes with dodos 

When it was discovered, the island of Mauritius was the home of a previously unknown species of bird, the dodo. Dodos were descendants of a type of pigeon which settled in Mauritius over 4 million years ago. With no predators to attack them, they lost their need and ability to fly.

In 1505, the Portuguese became the first humans to set foot on Mauritius. The island quickly became a stopover for ships engaged in the spice trade. Large numbers of dodos were killed for food.

Later, when the Dutch used the island as a penal colony, new species were introduced to the island. Rats, pigs and monkeys ate dodo eggs in the ground nests. The combination of human exploitation and introduced species significantly reduced the dodo population. Within 100 years of the arrival of humans on Mauritius, the once-abundant dodo became a rare bird. The last one was killed in 1681. The dodo is prominently featured as a supporter of the coat of arms of Mauritius.

French and British influences

Franco-Mauritian cuisine 
Mauritius has had strong ties with French culture throughout its history and was deeply influenced by the French people's "savoir vivre". French hunting traditions have also influenced Mauritian cuisine in the use of venison and wild boar, which is typically served on domaines or estates, restaurants and hotels. As years passed by, some have been adapted to the more exotic ingredients of the island to confer some unique flavour. French influences in Mauritian cuisine can be found in the consumption of Rougailles (light stew) scented with thyme, Daube (i.e. chicken or beef stew), croissants, baguette bread, bouillon, tuna salad, civet de lièvre and coq au vin served with good wine. Many forms of French desserts and cakes were influenced by the Franco-Mauritians and can also be found in France; such as tarts. French tarts and milk coffee is well-like by Franco-Mauritians.

Anglo-Mauritian cuisine 

The liking for afternoon tea in Mauritius is an influence from the British who took over the island in 1810.

Sino-Mauritian cuisine 

Sino-Mauritian cuisine includes both Chinese cuisine (transmitted from their ancestors and recently learnt through journeys to China) and localization of Chinese cuisine. Sino-Mauritian cuisine typically consist of fried vegetables, oyster sauce, fried rice, meat, and fish.

The 19th century saw the arrival of Chinese migrants, who came mostly from the south-eastern part of China; these Chinese migrants were mainly Cantonese from Guandong, Hakka from Meixian and Chinese people from Fujian. Chinese migrants mainly lived in harmony in the Chinatown in the capital of Port Louis and shared their culture with other communities. They are largely credited for making noodles, both steamed and fried, and fried rice popular. Sino-Mauritians also follow and/or have maintained some Chinese food traditions and customs. For example, the tradition of Chinese red eggs which are shared with family members. It is customary for Sino-Mauritians to eat fried noodles on birthday celebrations.

Between the 20th and 21st century, some Sino-Mauritian returned to China to learn new culinary dishes and returned to Mauritius introducing new dishes in their restaurant in Mauritius. In the 21st century, Sino-Mauritians, who resided overseas (e.g. in China, Taiwan) for a few years before returning to Mauritius, also introduced new Chinese food and drinks culture in Mauritius. For example, Bubble tea drinking culture was introduced by Fabrice Lee, a Sino-Mauritian, who in lived in Taiwan for 8 years before returning in Mauritius. The first bubble tea shop in Mauritius opened in late 2012; since then, there are bubble tea shops in most shopping malls on the island, becoming a popular place for teenagers to hangout.

Sino-Mauritian festival foods

Furthermore, Chinese and other Asian restaurants are present all around the island, and offer a variety of chicken, squid, beef and fish dishes, most typically prepared in black bean sauce or oyster sauce. Mauritian families often consider a dinner at an Asian restaurant as a treat. Delicacies such as shark fin soup and abalone soup can only be found in specialized Chinese restaurants.

Indo-Mauritian cuisine
Following the abolition of slavery, Indian workers who migrated to Mauritius during the 19th century brought their cuisine with them. Those indentured labourers came from different parts of India, each with their own culinary tradition, depending on the region. Traces of both northern and southern Indian cuisine can be found in Mauritius. As they are the majority population in Mauritius, they are largely contributed for making rice the staple dish. Dholl-puri and roti which are Indian-origins delicacies have become a common popular form of food for all Mauritians regardless of ethnicities.

Indo-Mauritian cuisine used common ingredients, such as dals (i.e. yellow-split peas), vegetables, beans, and pickles to accompany the dishes. It also uses extensive amount of spices; common spices include: saffron, cinnamon, cardamon, and cloves.

Mauritian Creole cuisine 
The creole cuisine is eaten by most Mauritians and has its influences from African, Indian, and French cuisine. Mauritian Creole dishes typically involves the consumption of seafood, fresh vegetables, pulses, beans, and corn.

Mauritian food and drink industry

Rum industry 

During the French and English administration, sugar production was fully exploited, considerably contributing to the economic development of the island.

François Mahé de Labourdonnais was the first person to support the development of rum industry in Mauritius. When Mauritius became a British colony, the plantation economy was mainly sugar cane. It was Dr. Pierre Charles François Harel who in 1850s initially proposed the concept of local distillation of rum in Mauritius. Mauritius today houses four distilleries (Grays, Medine, Chamarel and St Aubin) and is in the process of opening an additional three.

Tea industry 
Tea plant was introduced in Mauritius in 1760 by a French priest, Father Galloys. In 1770, Pierre Poivre planted tea plants on large scale. However, it was only in the 19th century under British rule that commercial tea cultivation was encouraged by Robert Farquhar, the Governor of Mauritius. Robert Farquhar had a tea garden at Le Reduit; however when he left Mauritius, no one  was interested in his project. Sir John Pope Hennessy, the 15th Governor of Mauritius, later revived local interest in tea cultivation and a tea plantation at Nouvelle France and at Chamarel.

Gallery

See also 

 Culture of Mauritius

References 

 www.tasteofmauritius.com.au
Mauritian culture
Mauritius